Quinton Kyle Coples (born June 22, 1990) is a former American football defensive end. He was drafted by the New York Jets in the first round of the 2012 NFL Draft, and has also played for the Miami Dolphins and Los Angeles Rams. He played college football at North Carolina.

High school career
Coples attended Kinston High School, and later transferred to Hargrave Military Academy in Chatham, Virginia. He was rated a four-star recruit by Rivals.com.

College career
As a junior in 2010 Coples was named a first team All-ACC selection after recording 59 tackles and 10 sacks. Coples finished college with 144 tackles, 24 sacks and 5 Forced fumbles.

Professional career

Pre-draft

Coples was considered one of the best defensive end prospects for the 2012 NFL Draft.

New York Jets
Coples was selected 16th overall in the first round of the 2012 NFL Draft by the New York Jets. He signed a four-year contract worth $8.8 million on May 17, 2012. During his rookie season of 2012, Coples compiled with 30 tackles and 5.5 sacks. The Jets finished 6–10 (tied 3rd in AFC East) that season.

With the acquisition of Sheldon Richardson in the 2013 NFL Draft, the Jets announced that Coples would transition to outside linebacker. During a preseason game against the Jacksonville Jaguars on August 17, 2013, Coples suffered a hairline ankle fracture after defending a pass thrown by Chad Henne. The Jets projected that Coples was going to be out indefinitely due to the injury but he eventually returned during Week 3 against the Buffalo Bills on September 22, 2013. During the 2013 season, Coples performed somewhat well at his new position as an outside linebacker playing 14 games (13 started) with 38 tackles, a forced fumble, 3 passes defended, and 4.5 sacks. The Jets finished 8–8 (tied 2nd in AFC East) that season.

In 2014, Coples played all 16 games with 15 starts mostly at the outside linebacker position and made 35 tackles with 6.5 sacks along with a forced fumble. The Jets plummeted to a 4-12 record, their worst record since 2007.

The Jets picked up the fifth-year, $7.8 million option of Coples' contract on April 23, 2015. Coples began to see limited playing time in 2015 due to lackluster performance, as he only made 8 tackles along with a fumble recovery in 10 games. The Jets waived Coples on November 23, 2015.

Miami Dolphins 
On November 24, 2015, Coples was claimed off waivers by the Miami Dolphins. He was released by the Dolphins on February 12, 2016.

Los Angeles Rams 
On March 16, 2016, Coples signed a two-year, $6.5 million contract with the Los Angeles Rams. He was released by the Rams on August 29, 2016.

References

External links

North Carolina Tar Heels bio 
New York Jets bio 
Miami Dolphins bio

1990 births
Living people
American football outside linebackers
American football defensive ends
North Carolina Tar Heels football players
New York Jets players
Miami Dolphins players
Los Angeles Rams players
People from Kinston, North Carolina
Players of American football from North Carolina
African-American players of American football
21st-century African-American sportspeople